"Fire and Rain" is a song written and performed by American singer-songwriter James Taylor, released in August 1970 by Warner Bros. Records as the second single from Taylor's second studio album, Sweet Baby James. The song follows Taylor's reaction to the suicide of Suzanne Schnerr, a childhood friend, and his experiences with drug addiction and fame. After its release, "Fire and Rain" peaked at number two on RPM Canada Top Singles chart and at number three on the Billboard Hot 100.

Background and composition
On the VH1 series Storytellers, Taylor said the song was about several incidents during his early recording career.  The second line "Suzanne, the plans they made put an end to you" refers to Suzanne Schnerr, a childhood friend of his who died by suicide while he was in London, England, recording his first album. In that same account, Taylor said he had been in a deep depression after the failure of his new band the Flying Machine to coalesce (the lyric "Sweet dreams and Flying Machines in pieces on the ground"; the reference is to the name of the band rather than a fatal plane crash, as was long rumored). Taylor completed writing the song while in rehab.

In 2005, during an interview on NPR, Taylor explained to host Scott Simon that the song was written in three parts:

The first part was about Taylor's friend Suzanne, who died while Taylor was in London working on his first album after being signed to Apple Records. Friends at home, concerned that it might distract Taylor from his big break, kept the tragic news from him, and he found out six months later.
The second part details Taylor's struggle to overcome drug addiction and depression.
The third part deals with coming to grips with fame and fortune, looking back at the road that got him there. It includes a reference to James Taylor and the Flying Machine, a band he briefly worked with before his big break with Paul McCartney, Peter Asher, and Apple Records.

Carole King played piano on the song. Drummer Russ Kunkel used brushes rather than sticks on his drum kit, and Bobby West played double bass in place of a bass guitar to "underscore the melancholy on the song".

King has stated that her song "You've Got a Friend", which Taylor recorded, was a response to the line in the refrain that "I've seen lonely times when I could not find a friend."

Taylor references the song in another of his compositions, "That's Why I'm Here", title track from his 1985 album, in which he writes, "Fortune and fame's such a curious game. Perfect strangers can call you by name. Pay good money to hear 'Fire and Rain' again and again and again."

He also refers to the song in another composition, "Money Machine" (a cynical take on the financial aspects of the recording industry): "When I began the game, see me singing ‘bout Fire and Rain; Lemme just sing it again — I've seen fives and I’ve seen tens."

Reception
Broadcast Music, Inc. ranked "Fire and Rain" at number 82 on its "Top 100 Songs of the Century" list, while voters for the National Endowment for the Arts and Recording Industry Association of America's Songs of the Century list, which comprises 365 songs of "historical significance" recorded from 1900 to 2000, placed "Fire and Rain" at number 85. In April 2011, the song was named at number 227 on Rolling Stones list of 500 greatest songs of all time.

Cover versions
R. B. Greaves, Johnny Rivers and Georgie Fame first released singles of "Fire and Rain" in 1970, impelling Warner Brothers to release Taylor's original as a single later that year, in August 1970. Greaves' and Rivers' versions peaked at numbers 82 and 94 on the Billboard Hot 100, respectively.
Marcia Hines covered "Fire and Rain" on her 1975 debut LP, Marcia Shines.  Her version reached No. 17 in Australia. At the 1975 Australian Record Awards, the song won Hines Female Vocal Single of the Year.

Parodies
Taylor performs the song on The Simpsons in the episode "Deep Space Homer". While singing the song for a group of astronauts (including Homer Simpson and Buzz Aldrin), he changes the lyric "Sweet dreams and flying machines in pieces on the ground" to "Sweet dreams and flying machines, flying safely through the air" when he realizes the Space Shuttle may crash.

In 2015, Taylor appeared on The Late Show with Stephen Colbert, where he sang a version including numerous references to post-1970 popular culture.

Chart performance

Weekly charts

Year-end charts

Other versions

Certifications

References

Bibliography

External links
 Transcript of Kerry O'Brien interview with Taylor about "Fire and Rain"

1969 songs
1970 singles
James Taylor songs
1975 singles
A&M Records singles
Herb Alpert songs
Atco Records singles
CBS Records singles
Georgie Fame songs
Grammy Hall of Fame Award recipients
R. B. Greaves songs
Tim Hardin songs
Marcia Hines songs
Imperial Records singles
Al Jarreau songs
Hubert Laws songs
Anne Murray songs
Willie Nelson songs
Reprise Records singles
Johnny Rivers songs
Song recordings produced by Peter Asher
Songs about suicide
Commemoration songs
Songs written by James Taylor
Warner Records singles
Andy Williams songs
Wizard Records singles
Songs about drugs